The 1998 Tour du Haut Var was the 30th edition of the Tour du Haut Var cycle race and was held on 21 February 1998. The race started and finished in Draguignan. The race was won by Laurent Jalabert.

General classification

References

1998
1998 in road cycling
1998 in French sport